Asota concinnula is a moth of the family Erebidae first described by Mabile in 1878. It is found in Zaire.

References

Asota (moth)
Insects of the Democratic Republic of the Congo
Moths of Africa
Moths described in 1878
Endemic fauna of the Democratic Republic of the Congo